Edward George Knapp-Fisher (8 January 19157 February 2003) was an Anglican bishop and scholar.

Life 

Knapp-Fisher was born in Chatham, Kent, United Kingdom. His father was also an Anglican priest.

He was educated at The King's School, Worcester, and at Trinity College, Oxford, where he took a First in Jurisprudence in 1936 (MA 1940). In 1938 he entered Wells Theological College and he was ordained deacon in 1939 and priest in 1940.

He was assistant curate of Brighouse (1940–42) before entering the Royal Naval Volunteer Reserve as a chaplain and serving in the Far East. In 1946 he was appointed chaplain of Cuddesdon College and he was briefly a member of the Oratory of the Good Shepherd. He spent the period 1949-52 as chaplain of St John's College, Cambridge (Cambridge MA 1949) and then he returned to Cuddesdon as principal from 1952 until 1960. He was noted for his imposition of a strictly disciplined lifestyle on his students. He particularly emphasised the 'custody of time' Later on Knapp-Fisher found that the 'custody of time' needed to be interpreted differently in South Africa. As well as being the principal of the theological college at Cuddesdon he was also vicar of the Church of All Saints, Cuddesdon and he served as rural dean 1958–60.

In 1960 he went to South Africa, where he had been elected Bishop of Pretoria (he had been offered the post several times before eventually taking it up). He was instrumental in the founding of St Alban's College in 1963. In 1967 he was appointed to the Anglican-Roman Catholic Joint Preparatory Commission, and in 1969 to the International Commission (ARCIC) itself, on which he served until 1981. Like other bishops of that time in South Africa, Knapp-Fisher was critical of Apartheid.

He came back to England in 1975 when he was appointed Canon Residentiary of Westminster Abbey and Archdeacon of Westminster, serving as sub-dean of the Abbey from 1982 until his retirement in 1987. He was installed as Canon on 26 July 1975. His sub-deanship coincided with a long vacancy in the deanery itself and he was therefore responsible for organising the wedding of Prince Andrew and Sarah Ferguson on 23 July 1986. He was also an Assistant Bishop in the Diocese of Southwark (August 19751987) and Diocese of London (1976–1986).

He retired to Chichester where he was an honorary assistant bishop in the Diocese of Chichester and Custos of St Mary's Hospital.

He was a member of The Ecumenical Society of the Blessed Virgin Mary.

He died in February 2003 at the age of 88. He was survived by his wife Joan Bradley whom he met in South Africa.

Published works

References 

1915 births
2003 deaths
Alumni of Trinity College, Oxford
Anglican bishops of Pretoria
Archdeacons of Westminster
20th-century British theologians
Anglican writers
Chaplains of Cuddesdon College
College chaplains of the University of Cambridge
Fellows of St John's College, Cambridge
People from Chatham, Kent
Royal Naval Volunteer Reserve personnel of World War II
Canons of Westminster
Staff of Ripon College Cuddesdon
20th-century Anglican Church of Southern Africa bishops